Suthasini Sawettabut (born 9 December 1994) is a Thai table tennis player.

Suthasini started playing table tennis at the age of 6. Suthasini got fourth place for the Women's singles in the 2010 Youth Olympics.

She has qualified to represent Thailand at the 2020 Summer Olympics. She has made new history for Thailand as she reached round of 16 in 2020 Summer Olympics, the first ever Thai player who can reached this round after defeated by Mima Ito 0-4 games.

Achievements

ITTF Tours 
Women's singles

Women's doubles

Notes

References

External links 
http://www.siamsport.co.th/seagames2015/?page=news&view=view&id=150605070003
https://web.archive.org/web/20160304103306/http://www.thaitabletennis.com/wizContent.asp?wizConID=914

1994 births
Living people
Suthasini Sawettabut
Suthasini Sawettabut
Table tennis players at the 2010 Summer Youth Olympics
Table tennis players at the 2016 Summer Olympics
Suthasini Sawettabut
Table tennis players at the 2010 Asian Games
Table tennis players at the 2014 Asian Games
Southeast Asian Games medalists in table tennis
Suthasini Sawettabut
Suthasini Sawettabut
Suthasini Sawettabut
Table tennis players at the 2018 Asian Games
Competitors at the 2009 Southeast Asian Games
Competitors at the 2015 Southeast Asian Games
Suthasini Sawettabut
Competitors at the 2017 Southeast Asian Games
Competitors at the 2019 Southeast Asian Games
Expatriate table tennis people in Japan
Thai expatriate sportspeople in Japan
Nippon Paint Mallets players
Table tennis players at the 2020 Summer Olympics
Competitors at the 2021 Southeast Asian Games
Suthasini Sawettabut